Jan Erik Düring (15 June 1926 – 13 March 2014) was a Norwegian film director. He was born in Bærum. Among his films are Hjelp - vi får leilighet! (1965), Lucie (1979), the musical Bør Børson Jr. from 1974, and the comedy Deilig er fjorden! from 1985.

Düring also chaired the trade union .

References 

1926 births
2014 deaths
People from Bærum
Norwegian film directors